Ofelia Island is the 560 m long in southeast-northwest direction and 270 m wide rocky island in Ambush Bay on the north coast of Joinville Island in the Joinville Island group, Antarctica.

The island is “named after the ocean fishing trawler Ofelia of the Bulgarian company Ocean Fisheries – Burgas that operated in Antarctic waters off South Georgia during its fishing trip under Captain Nikola Levenov from September 1977 to April 1978. The Bulgarian fishermen, along with those of the Soviet Union, Poland and East Germany are the pioneers of modern Antarctic fishing industry.”

Location
British mapping in 1973.

Maps
 Joinville Island. Scale 1:250000 topographic map SP 21-22/14. Directorate of Overseas Surveys, 1973.
 Antarctic Digital Database (ADD). Scale 1:250000 topographic map of Antarctica. Scientific Committee on Antarctic Research (SCAR). Since 1993, regularly upgraded and updated.

Notes

References
 Ofelia Island. SCAR Composite Gazetteer of Antarctica.
 Bulgarian Antarctic Gazetteer. Antarctic Place-names Commission. (details in Bulgarian, basic data in English)

External links
 Ofelia Island. Copernix satellite image

Islands of Graham Land
Joinville Island group
Ocean Fisheries – Burgas Co
Bulgaria and the Antarctic